Taşhan is a historical caravanserai in Mersin Province, Turkey.

The caravanserai was constructed in 1723-1725 by an Ottoman mutasarrıf (governor) named Hacı Sunullah Pasha. It is a rectangular-plan caravanserai. After the period of caravans the caravanserai was used as a local bazaar. But for the last 30 years, it was out of commission.
In 2020 Mersin Metropolitan Municipality and Arslan family (the owner of building) decided to open the bazaar as a Producer Women’s  market. The opening ceremony was held on 26 September 2020. Mersin metropolitan mayor Vahap Seçer as well as Mut mayor Volkan Şeker and the owner of the building were present in the ceremony. The honoured quest was folk musician Musa Eroğlu.

References

Caravanserais in Turkey
Mut District
Buildings and structures completed in 1725
Commercial buildings completed in the 18th century
Buildings and structures in Mersin Province
Buildings and structures of the Ottoman Empire
Ottoman caravanserais
1720s establishments in the Ottoman Empire
Bazaars in Turkey
History of Mersin Province
Ottoman Empire